The 2006 World Sprint Speed Skating Championships is a long track speed skating event that was held on January 21–22, 2006, in the Thialf, in Heerenveen, Netherlands.

Rules 
All participating skaters are allowed to skate the two 500 and 1000 meters. Skaters with equal overall points are ranked according to their results in the last distance.

Men championships

Sprint results

Women championships

Sprint results

References

External links
ISU website

World Sprint Speed Skating Championships, 2006
2006 World Sprint
World Sprint, 2006
World Sprint Speed Skating Championships, 2006
World Sprint Speed Skating